Sanctification (or in its verb form, sanctify) literally means "to set apart for special use or purpose", that is, to make holy or sacred (compare ).  Therefore, sanctification refers to the state or process of being set apart, i.e. "made holy", as a vessel, full of the Holy Spirit of God.  The concept of sanctification is widespread among religions, including Judaism and especially Christianity. The term can be used to refer to objects which are set apart for special purposes, but the most common use within Christian theology is in reference to the change brought about by God in a believer, begun at the point of salvation and continuing throughout the life of the believer. Many forms of Christianity believe that this process will only be completed in Heaven, but some believe that complete holiness is possible in this life.

Judaism

In rabbinic Judaism sanctification means sanctifying God's name by works of mercy and martyrdom, while desecration of God's name means committing sin. This is based on the Jewish concept of God, whose holiness is pure goodness and is transmissible by sanctifying people and things.

Christianity
In the various branches of Christianity sanctification usually refers to a person becoming holy, with the details differing in different branches.

Roman Catholicism
The Catholic Church upholds the doctrine of sanctification, teaching that:

According to the Catholic Encyclopedia "sanctity" differs for God, individual, and corporate body. For God, it is God's unique absolute moral perfection. For the individual, it is a close union with God and the resulting moral perfection. It is essentially of God, by a divine gift. For a society, it is the ability to produce and secure holiness in its members, who display a real, not merely nominal, holiness. The Church's holiness is beyond human power, beyond natural power.

Sanctity is regulated by established conventional standards.

Eastern Orthodoxy

Orthodox Christianity teaches the doctrine of theosis, whereby humans take on divine properties, and in a particular sense, participate in the being of God. A key scripture supporting this is 2 Peter 1:4. In the 4th century, Athanasius of Alexandria taught that God became Man that man might become God.
Essentially, man does not become divine, but in Christ can partake of divine nature. This Church's version of salvation restores the likeness of God in man.
One such theme is release from mortality caused by desires of the world.

Lutheranism
Martin Luther taught in his Large Catechism that Sanctification is only caused by the Holy Spirit through the powerful Word of God. The Holy Spirit uses churches to gather Christians together for the teaching and preaching of the Word of God.

Luther also viewed the Ten Commandments as means by which the Holy Spirit sanctifies. "Thus we have the Ten Commandments, a commend of divine doctrine, as to what we are to do in order that our whole life may be pleasing to God, and the true fountain and channel from and in which everything must arise and flow that is to be a good work, so that outside of the Ten Commandments no work or thing can be good or pleasing to God, however great or precious it be in the eyes of the world...whoever does attain to them is a heavenly, angelic man, far above all holiness of the world. Only occupy yourself with them, and try your best, apply all power and ability, and you will find so much to do that you will neither seek nor esteem any other work or holiness."

Pietistic Lutheranism heavily emphasizes the "biblical divine commands of believers to live a holy life and to strive for holy living, or sanctification."

Anabaptism
Anabaptist belief emphasizes that sanctification is initiated by being born again by the Spirit of God and then practiced by following or being a disciple of Christ. The role of the Spirit, Word of God, suffering, self-denial as well as the community of believers in sanctification is also considered essential. Sanctification is believed to be a process that begins with conversion and continues throughout the Christian life. Perfectionism or eradication of the flesh is rejected and it is considered necessary to take up the cross and deny yourself daily to truly be a disciple of Christ. When a believer steps out of the sanctification process, his salvation is seen as jeopardized. Sanctification is seen as mortifying the deeds of the flesh, cleansing impure motives and thoughts of the mind and heart as well as glorifying the Father through worship, obedience and faith working in love.

Anglicanism
A 2002 Anglican publishing house book states that “there is no explicit teaching on sanctification in the Anglican formularies”. A glossary of the Episcopal Church (USA) gives some teaching: “Anglican formularies have tended to speak of sanctification as the process of God's work within us by means of which we grow into the fullness of the redeemed life.” Outside official formularies sanctification has been an issue in the Anglican Communion since its inception.

The 16th  century Anglican theologian Richard Hooker (1554-1600) distinguished between the “righteousness of justification” that is imputed by God and the “righteousness of sanctification” that comprises the works one does as an “inevitable” result of being justified.

Jeremy Taylor (1613-1667) argued that justification and sanctification cannot be separated; they are “two steps in a long process”.

A 19th century Church of England work agreed with Jeremy Taylor that justification and sanctification are “inseparable”. However, they are not the same thing. Justification is “found in Christ's work alone”. “Sanctification is the work of the Holy Spirit in us, and is a progressive work.”

Baptist
Baptists believe in progressive sanctification, the work of sanctification of the believer through grace and the decisions of the believer after the new birth.

Reformed
It is not clear that John Calvin, in his Institutes of the Christian Religion, conceives of sanctification as a doctrine separate from justification. There is no separate treatment there of a doctrine of sanctification. Instead, the clearest references he makes to the process of the Christian's growth in holiness appear in Book III of the Institutes, which concerns the work of the Holy Spirit. There he intermixes the grace by which justification is accomplished and the grace that empowers the Christian toward moral reform. Following Augustine, Calvin embraces a non-perfectionist account of sanctification as progressive but incomplete until eschatological consummation:"I insist not that the life of the Christian shall breathe nothing but the perfect Gospel, though this is to be desired, and ought to be attempted. I insist not so strictly on evangelical perfection, as to refuse to acknowledge as a Christian any man who has not attained it. In this way all would be excluded from the church, since there is no man who is not far removed from this perfection, while many, who have made but little progress, would be undeservedly rejected."  Against those who "maintain the perfection of holiness in the present life," Calvin replies:"...we deem it sufficient briefly to reply with Augustine, that the goal to which all the pious ought to aspire is, to appear in the presence of God without spot or blemish; but as the course of the present life is at best nothing more than progress, we shall never reach the goal until we have laid aside the body of sin, and been completely united to the Lord."  But the imperfection of sanctification in this life is not, for Calvin, an excuse for slackness in the search thereof. The grace of justification is not separable from the grace that makes one perform good works and the grace that perfects what is deficient in the works of the regenerate:“Justification, moreover, we thus define: the sinner being admitted into communion with Christ is, for his sake, reconciled to God; when purged by his blood he obtains the remission of sins, and clothed with righteousness, just as if it were his own, stands secure before the judgment seat of heaven. Forgiveness of sins being previously given, the good works which follow have a value different from their merit, because whatever is imperfect in them is covered by the perfection of Christ, and all their blemishes and pollutions are wiped away by his purity, so as never to come under the cognizance of the divine tribunal. The guilt of all transgressions, by which men are prevented from offering God an acceptable service, being thus effaced, and the imperfection which is wont to sully even good works being buried, the good works which are done by believers are deemed righteous, or, which is the same thing, are imputed for righteousness.”

Methodist
In Wesleyan–Arminian theology, which is upheld by the Methodist Churches (inclusive of the holiness movement), Methodism teaches that sanctification has three components—initial, progressive, and entire:

As such, "sanctification, the beginning of holiness, begins at the new birth". With the Grace of God, Methodists "do works of piety and mercy, and these works reflect the power of sanctification". Examples of these means of grace (works of piety and works of mercy) that aid with sanctification include frequent reception of the sacrament of Holy Communion (work of piety), and visiting the sick and those in prison (work of mercy). Wesleyan covenant theology also emphasizes that an important aspect of sanctification is the keeping of the moral law contained in the Ten Commandments. As such, in "sanctification one grows to be more like Christ." This process of sanctification that begins at the new birth (first work of grace) has its goal as Christian perfection, also known as entire sanctification (second work of grace), which John Wesley, the progenitor of the Methodist faith, described as a heart "habitually filled with the love of God and neighbor" and as "having the mind of Christ and walking as he walked".  To John Wesley the work of entire sanctification was distinctly separate from regeneration, and was "wrought instantaneously, though it may be approached by slow and gradual steps." A more complete statement of Wesley's position goes like this:"It is that habitual disposition of soul which, in the sacred writings, is termed holiness; and which directly implies, the being cleansed from sin, 'from all filthiness both of flesh and spirit;' and, by consequence, the being endued with those virtues which were also in Christ Jesus; the being so 'renewed in the spirit of our mind,' as to be 'perfect as our Father in heaven is perfect.'"This is the doctrine that by the power of God's sanctifying grace and attention upon the means of grace may cleanse a Christian of the corrupting influence of original sin in this life. It is expounded upon in the Methodist Articles of Religion: 

Justification is seen as an initial step of acknowledging God's holiness, with sanctification as, through the grace and power of God, entering into it.  A key scripture is Hebrews 12:14:  "Follow after...holiness, without which no one shall see the Lord." The importance of "growth in grace", according to Methodist doctrine, is important before and after entire sanctification:

In the same vein, in addition to entire sanctification, the Kentucky Mountain Holiness Association affirms a belief in "the progressive growth in grace toward Christian maturity through a consistent Christian life of faith and good works."
Methodist theology teaches that the state of entire sanctification can be lost through willful sin:

If a person backslides but later decides to return to God, he or she must confess his or her sins and be entirely sanctified again (see conditional security).

John Wesley taught outward holiness as an expression of "inward transformation" and theologians in the Wesleyan/Methodist tradition have noted that the observance of standards of dress and behaviour should follow the New Birth as an act of obedience to God.

Pentecostalism
There are two Pentecostal positions on sanctification, entire sanctification and progressive sanctification.

Entire sanctification as a second work of grace, is the position of Pentecostal denominations that originally had their roots in Wesleyan-Arminian theology, such as International Pentecostal Holiness Church, Church of God (Cleveland) and Church of God in Christ. These denominations differ from the Methodist Churches (inclusive of the Holiness Movement) in that they teach the possibility of a third work of grace—glossolalia.

Progressive sanctification is the work of sanctification of the believer through grace and the decisions of the believer after the new birth. This is the position of other Pentecostal denominations, such as Assemblies of God and The Foursquare Church.

Quakerism
George Fox, the founder of Quakerism, taught Christian perfection, also known in the Friends tradition as "Perfectionism", in which the Christian believer could be made free from sin. In his Some Principles of the Elect People of God Who in Scorn are called Quakers, for all the People throughout all Christendome to Read over, and thereby their own States to Consider, he writes in section "XVI. Concerning Perfection":

The early Quakers, following Fox, taught that as a result of the New Birth through the power of the Holy Spirit, man could be free from actual sinning if he continued to rely on the inward light and "focus on the cross of Christ as the center of faith". George Fox emphasized "personal responsibility for faith and emancipation from sin" in his teaching on perfectionism. For the Christian, "perfectionism and freedom from sin were possible in this world".

Some Quaker denominations were founded to emphasize this teaching, such as the Central Yearly Meeting of Friends.

Keswickianism
Keswickian theology, which emerged in the Higher Life Movement, teaches a second work of grace that occurs through "surrender and faith", in which God keeps an individual from sin. Keswickian denominations, such as the Christian and Missionary Alliance, differ from the Wesleyan-Holiness movement in that the Christian and Missionary Alliance does not see entire sanctification as cleansing one from original sin, whereas holiness denominations espousing the Wesleyan-Arminian theology affirm this belief.

The Church of Jesus Christ of Latter-day Saints
In the Church of Jesus Christ of Latter-day Saints, sanctification is viewed as a process and gift from God which makes every willing member holy, according to their repentance and righteous efforts, through the Savior Jesus Christ's matchless grace. To become Sanctified, or Holy, one must do all that he can to live as Christ lived, according to the teachings of Christ. One must strive to live a holy life to truly be considered Holy. In the Church's scriptural canon, one reference to sanctification appears in Helaman 3:35, in the Book of Mormon: Elder Dallin H. Oaks, then of the Quorum of the Twelve Apostles, also expounded on the meaning of sanctity.

Islam
In Islam, sanctification is termed as tazkiah, other similarly used words to the term are Islah-i qalb (reform of the heart), Ihsan (beautification), taharat (purification), Ikhlas (purity), qalb-is-salim (pure/safe/undamaged heart).  Tasawuf (Sufism), basically an ideology rather than a term, is mostly misinterpreted as the idea of sanctification in Islam and it is used to pray about saints, especially among Sufis, in whom it is common to say "that God sanctifies his secret" ("qaddasa Llahou Sirruhu"), and that the Saint is alive or dead.

See also

The Mitzvah of sanctifying the Kohen
Charisma
Consecration
Divine Grace
Glorification
Imparted righteousness
Justification (theology)
Means of Grace
Righteousness
Shuddhi
Social Gospel

References

External links
Sanctification: heat and glow from the fire, Forward in Christ 

Sanctification: A Biblical Perspective

Theology
Christian ethics
Christian terminology
Religious terminology
Holy Spirit
Christian personal development

de:Heiligung